Sukhinder Singh Cassidy (born Sukhinder Singh in 1970) is a technology executive and entrepreneur. Formerly the president of StubHub, she has worked at various tech and media companies including Google, Amazon and News Corp, Yodlee (YODL), and Polyvore. In 2011, she founded JOYUS, the video shopping platform for women, and served as CEO then Chairman until 2017. Singh Cassidy is also Founder of theBoardlist.

Early life and education
Cassidy was born in 1970 in Dar es Salaam, Tanzania, to parents of Indian Sikh descent. Her family moved to Ontario, Canada, when she was two years old. She grew up in St. Catharines, Ontario, in the Niagara Region. Cassidy graduated from the University of Western Ontario and earned her Honours in business adninistration from that university's Ivey School of Business in 1992.

Cassidy was raised in an entrepreneurial family. Both of her parents were doctors and ran a medical practice for thirty years.

Career

Early career
Cassidy started her career in investment banking at Merrill Lynch in New York. She moved to the Merrill Lynch London office 1994. She then worked as an analyst for British Sky Broadcasting.

In 1998, Cassidy moved to Silicon Valley and joined ecommerce startup Junglee (company) as Head of Business Development. Junglee was acquired by Amazon in 1998. Following the acquisition, Cassidy joined Amazon, where she led merchant business development for the first generation of Amazon marketplace. According to Bloomberg Business, she helped create "one of the company's first programs designed to deliver shoppers to merchants that carried what the buyers were looking for."

Cassidy co-founded financial services platform Yodlee in 1999 with five engineering co-founders, including Schwark Satyavolu. and served as SVP of Sales and Business Development from 1999 to 2003. In 2014, Yodlee went public, trading under the ticker YODL.

In 2003, Cassidy joined Google as the first General Manager for Google Local & Maps, and Head of Content Acquisition for Books, Library, Scholar, Shopping and Video. There she launched Google Local and Maps, with product manager Bret Taylor and a team of engineers. In 2004, she became head of Google's international operations in Asia Pacific (APAC) and Latin America (LATAM), becoming VP in 2005 and then President of APAC and LATAM in 2008. Singh-Cassidy is credited with building Google's presence across 103 countries in Asia Pacific and Latin America.

In 2009, Cassidy left Google to become CEO-in-Residence at venture capital firm Accel Partners. Singh Cassidy was named CEO of Polyvore in 2010,.

Joyus
In October 2010, Cassidy had the idea for a new platform aimed at converging content and commerce through online video as a way to increase consumer engagement with products and drive direct purchases via the video. She founded JOYUS in January, 2011 in San Francisco, CA. Joyus.com launched to the public in August, 2011. Singh Cassidy raised $7.9 million in seed funding from Accel Partners, Harrison Metal, Joel Hyatt, Venky Harinarayan & Anand Rajaraman. In 2012, JOYUS raised a second round of funding totaling $11.5 million from Interwest and Time Warner, as well as existing investors.

JOYUS was ranked one of the "Hot 100" e-retailing websites by Internet Retailer in 2012; and one of the "Top 25 Ecommerce Companies to Watch" by Brand Innovators in 2013. JOYUS was a winner of the 2013 Brightcove Innovation Awards and a winner of the 2013 L’Oreal Next Generation Digital Awards. JOYUS was featured by Apple as one of the best Lifestyle shopping apps for the 2014 holiday season.

JOYUS was acquired by StackCommerce in September, 2017.

#ChoosePossibility Project and theBoardlist
In May 2015, Cassidy published an open letter, titled "Tech Women Choose Possibility", challenging the tech community to increase the rate of progress for women in the industry by leveraging its wealth of existing female talent. The letter was co-signed by 59 female entrepreneurs and investors. Singh Cassidy based the letter on her own experiences as a tech entrepreneur and research she conducted on 230 female founders and CEOs of tech companies.

Cassidy launched theBoardlist, the first initiative of the #ChoosePossibility Project, on July 15, 2015. theBoardlist is an online marketplace that connects CEOs who are looking for board candidates with women who are peer-endorsed for private and public tech company boards. When it launched, theBoardlist included the names of over 600 women who had been endorsed by 50 investors and CEOs in the tech industry, from companies including Accel Partners, Greylock Partners, Twitter, Lyft and Box.

On October 20, 2015, theBoardlist announced that it had facilitated its first placement of a woman to the board of a private tech company.

As of late 2017, theBoardlist had attracted over 1,400 executives to nominate over 2,100 women for board service, and influenced over 100 board placements.

Singh Cassidy was president of StubHub from April 2018 until May 2020.

Xero
On November 10th 2022, Cassidy was named as CEO of Xero Ltd, the NZ-headquartered technology company and provider of cloud-based accounting tools for small and medium-sized businesses and accountants. Starting with Xero on November 28th, Cassidy formally became CEO on 1 February 2023.

Personal life
Cassidy is married to Simon Cassidy, a fellow Canadian and former hedge-fund manager who runs an independent investment firm. The couple have three children and live in the San Francisco Bay Area.

Organizations founded
 Yodlee
 Joyus
 theBoardlist

Board member and advisor
Cassidy serves as a public board director at TripAdvisor (TRIP), Ericsson (ERIC), and Urban Outfitters (URBN). She previously served on the boards of J. Crew Group, Inc.(JCG), StitchFix, and as an advisor to Twitter.

Honors
 Named one of the Most Creative People in Business by Fast Company (2017)
 Named one of the "Silicon Valley 100" by Business Insider (2016, 2012) 
 Named a "Power Women" by Forbes (2014)
 Featured in book, Good Leaders Learn: Lessons from Lifetimes of Leadership (2013)
 Named one of "The Silicon Valley 100" by Business Insider (2012)
 Named one of "44 Female Founders Every Entrepreneur Should Know" (2012)
 Named one of "14 Incredible Women to Watch in Silicon Valley" (2012)
 Included in Ad Age list of "Women to Watch" (2010)
 Selected as TechFellow Awards’ first General Management Fellow in recognition of outstanding innovation in General Management (2009)
 Named by Fortune as one of "tech's next-gen leaders" and featured on the cover of the annual Most Powerful Women Magazine addition (2008)

Notable Speaker
 Keynote Speaker, Dreamforce 2016
 Keynote Speaker, Retail Council of Canada, Store 2015
 Keynote Speaker at IRCE 2014 – Internet Retailer Conference & Exhibition
 Keynote Speaker, D2C Convention 2014
 Keynote Speaker, Stanford University's Entrepreneurship Thought Leadership Series, 2012
 Keynote Speaker, SVB CEO Summit West, 2012
 Speaker, AllThingsD Asia, 2011
 Keynote speaker at DLDWomen, 2010
 Keynote Speaker at India Conclave, 2007
 Featured in book, Innovation nation : Canadian leadership from Java to Jurassic Park (2002)

Angel investing
Singh Cassidy is an angel investor whose investments include:
 the Real Real
 Soma Water
 J. Hilburn
 Heartwork

References

External links
 Sukhinder Singh on Twitter
 theBoardlist
 theBoardlist on Twitter

American women business executives
Google employees
21st-century American businesspeople
Tanzanian emigrants to Canada
1970 births
Living people
Businesspeople from California
Women corporate directors
21st-century American businesswomen